All Saints Catholic School or All Saints Roman Catholic School may refer to:

United Kingdom
 All Saints Catholic School, Dagenham, England
 All Saints Catholic School, West Wickham, England
 All Saints Roman Catholic School, York, England

United States
 All Saints Catholic School (Norwalk, Connecticut)
 All Saints Catholic School (Omaha, Nebraska)
 All Saints Catholic School, in the Roman Catholic Diocese of Dallas, Texas

See also
 All Saints Academy (disambiguation)
 All Saints College (disambiguation)
 All Saints High School (disambiguation)
 All Saints University (disambiguation)
 All Saints (disambiguation), includes other schools called "All Saints"